The Big East Conference gave five football awards at the conclusion of every season. The awards were first given in 1991 following the conference's first football season, and last given in 2012 before the conference was restructured as the American Athletic Conference. The five awards included Offensive Player of the Year, Defensive Player of the Year, Special Teams Player of the Year, Rookie of the Year, and Coach of the Year. Recipients were selected by the votes of the conference's eight head coaches.

Award recipients included Heisman Trophy winners, NFL first-round draft picks, and NFL All-Star selections. The Miami Hurricanes were the most successful team through the school's tenure with the conference from 1991 to 2004, winning six awards for offensive players, seven for defense, four for special teams, three for Rookie of the Year, and six for Coach of the Year. Every conference member received at least two awards.

Donovan McNabb of Syracuse is the only player to win more than two awards; he was named Rookie of the Year in 1995 and Offensive Player of the Year in 1996, 1997, and 1998. Frank Beamer of Virginia Tech, Dennis Erickson of Miami, and Brian Kelly of Cincinnati were each Coach of the Year three times.

Offensive Player of the Year

The Offensive Player of the Year was awarded to the player voted most-outstanding at an offensive position. The first two awards were given to quarterback Gino Torretta of the University of Miami. In 1992, Torretta was a unanimous selection, the first of only two players to receive that distinction as of 2012. The other unanimous selection was running back Jordan Todman of Connecticut in 2010. There have been three ties: in 1996, 2001, and 2002, and a three-way tie in 2001. Besides Torretta, quarterbacks Ken Dorsey of Miami and Pat White of West Virginia have both been awarded twice; Dorsey's awards in 2001 and 2002 were both ties. Donovan McNabb was selected three times and became the second overall pick in the 1999 NFL Draft. Miami has received the most awards, six before leaving the conference in 2004. Only South Florida (who joined in 2005) and Temple (which joined in 1991, was expelled after the 2004 season, and returned in 2012) have no offensive winners.

Of the 27 winners, there were 15 quarterbacks, eight running backs, three wide receivers, and one tight end. Nine seniors, seven juniors, nine sophomores, and two freshmen were honored.

Winners

Winners by school

Defensive Player of the Year
The Defensive Player of the Year award was given 26 times, with ties in 1991, 2001, 2009, and 2011. Of the 26 winners, 16 were defensive linemen. Seven linebackers and three safeties were honored. Of the recipients, 17 were seniors, eight juniors, and George Selvie the only sophomore.

The first award in 1991 was a tie between Darrin Smith, a Miami linebacker, and George Rooks, a defensive lineman from Syracuse. Miami then won three consecutive awards between 1992 and 1994. Only two players have won the award twice—Corey Moore in 1998 and 1999, and Khaseem Greene, who shared the award in 2011 and won it outright in 2012.

Like Offensive Player of the Year, Miami won the most defensive awards as well, with seven. Pittsburgh follows with the second most awards with five, including the 2009 Co-Defensive Players of the Year, which is the only occasion where two teammates have been co-selected in the same season. During Temple's first tenure in Big East football from 1991 to 2004, its only conference award was when Dan Klecko won Defensive Player of the Year honors in 2002. Of the original 1991 members, Pittsburgh took the longest to win the defensive award, first winning with H.B. Blades in 2006. Pittsburgh won again with another linebacker, Scott McKillop, in 2008. The only member that has failed to win this award is Connecticut, which did not join Big East football until 2004.

Winners

Winners by school

Special Teams Player of the Year
The Special Teams Player of the Year award was given to the player voted best on special teams. The recipient was either be a placekicker, punter, returner, or a position known as a gunner. The first winner was Kevin Williams, a returner from Miami. Andy Lee, a Pittsburgh punter, and Cincinnati kick returner Mardy Gilyard were the only players to receive the award more than once.

There were 24 recipients, with ties in 2002 and 2003. Of the award recipients, 12 were seniors, nine juniors, and three sophomores. Three placekickers won the award, most recently Virginia Tech's Shayne Graham in 1999. Todd Sauerbrun was the first punter to win after he was a unanimous selection in 1994.

Notably, Temple players received both the Special Teams Player of the Year and Rookie of the Year (see below) awards in 2012, the first year of the Owls' last Big East tenure. During Temple's previous tenure in Big East football from 1991 to 2004, the Owls received only one conference award.

Winners

Winners by school

Rookie of the Year
The Rookie of the Year award was given to the conference's best freshman. Tom Tumulty from Pittsburgh was the first winner. Donovan McNabb, Michael Vick, Dion Lewis, Larry Fitzgerald, and Teddy Bridgewater also won Offensive Player of the Year honors, with Vick and Lewis winning both awards in the same season.

Winners

Winners by school

Coach of the Year
Dennis Erickson won the first two awards with Miami in 1991 and 1992 after 12–0 and 11–0 seasons, respectively. Erickson, Brian Kelly (then of Cincinnati), and Frank Beamer of Virginia Tech each won the award three times. Larry Coker, Rich Rodriguez, Charlie Strong, and Walt Harris have each won twice. Miami and Rutgers had the most individual winners of the award, with three. Terry Shea of Rutgers is the only winner after a losing season, while Walt Harris was 6–6 in 1997.

The award was shared twice; both times, Strong was one of the recipients. He shared the award with Randy Edsall in 2010 and Kyle Flood in 2012. Five coaches have won the award in their first year at a school—Harris in 1997, Coker in 2001, Kelly in 2007, Strong in 2010, and Flood in 2012.

Winners

Winners by school

Footnotes
 Miami left the Big East for the Atlantic Coast Conference (ACC) after 2004.
 The 2012 season was the last for Pittsburgh and Syracuse in the Big East. Both schools will join the ACC in July 2013.
 Virginia Tech left for the ACC after 2004.
 West Virginia left for the Big 12 Conference after 2011.
 Boston College left for the ACC after 2005.
 Louisville has announced it will leave for the ACC after 2013.
 Rutgers has announced it will leave for the Big Ten after 2013.
 Temple, then a football-only member, was expelled from the Big East after the 2004 season due to poor attendance and non-competitiveness. They spent the following two seasons as an independent before becoming a football-only member of the Mid-American Conference in 2007. The Owls returned to Big East football in 2012, and became an all-sports member of the renamed Big East in 2013.
 Michael Vick and Dion Lewis were selected as both Rookie of the Year and Offensive Player of the Year in the same season, 1999 and 2009, respectively.

See also
 American Athletic Conference football individual awards

References

College football conference awards and honors
Big East Conference football